The 1st Arizona State Legislature, consisting of the Arizona State Senate and the Arizona House of Representatives, was constituted from February 14, 1912 (the day Arizona was admitted to the United States) to December 31, 1914, during the first term of George Wylle Paul Hunt as Governor of Arizona, in Phoenix. The legislature was heavily skewed towards the Democrats, with their holding a 15–4 lead in the senate, and a 31–4 lead in the Arizona House of Representatives The number of senators and representatives was set by the State Constitution, with 9 counties being granted one Senator, while the other 5 were granted two.  Representation in the house was also by county, apportioned by population, with each county being guaranteed a minimum of 1 Representation.

History
With the transition to Statehood, the Territorial Governor, Richard E. Sloan, announced that the first statewide elections were to be held on December 12, 1911.  Among other statewide offices, Sloan proclaimed that there would be 19 State Senators and 35 members of the State House of Representatives, apportioned by counties. Apache, Coconino, Mohave, Navajo, Pinal, Santa Cruz Countes were allotted 1 senator and 1 representative; Cochise County got 2 senators and 7 representatives; Gila, Pima Counties got 2 senators and 3 representatives; Graham, Greenlee, and Yuma Counties received 1 senator and 2 representatives; Maricopa got 2 senators and 6 representatives; Yavapai County received 2 senators and 4 representatives. The primary election was held on October 24, 1911.

Sessions
The Legislature met for the regular session at the State Capitol in Phoenix on March 18, 1912; and adjourned on May 18.

A special session was called by the governor, and met between May 23 – June 22, 1912. A second special session was invoked from February 3 – April 7, 1913. A third special session was convened from April 14 – May 17, 1913.

State Senate

Members
The asterisk (*) denotes members of the previous Legislature who continued in office as members of this Legislature.

House of Representatives

Members
The asterisk (*) denotes members of the previous Legislature who continued in office as members of this Legislature.

References

Arizona legislative sessions
Arizona
Arizona
Arizona
1912 in Arizona
1913 in Arizona
1914 in Arizona